Safari is a web browser developed by Apple. It is built into Apple's operating systems, including macOS, iOS, and iPadOS, and uses Apple's open-source browser engine WebKit, which was derived from KHTML.

Safari was introduced in Mac OS X Panther in January 2003. It was included with the iPhone since the latter's first generation, which came out in 2007. At that time, Safari was the fastest browser on the Mac. Between 2007 and 2012, Apple maintained a Windows version, but abandoned it due to low market share. In 2010, Safari 5 introduced a reader mode, extensions, and developer tools. Safari 11, released in 2017, added Intelligent Tracking Prevention, which uses artificial intelligence to block web tracking. Safari 13 added support for Apple Pay, and authentication with FIDO2 security keys. Its interface was redesigned in Safari 15.

Background 
After its 1994 release Netscape Navigator rapidly became the dominant Mac browser, and eventually came bundled with Mac OS. In 1996, Microsoft released Internet Explorer for Mac, and Apple released the Cyberdog internet suite, which included a web browser. In 1997, Apple shelved Cyberdog, and reached a five-year agreement with Microsoft to make IE the default browser on the Mac, starting with Mac OS 8.1. Netscape continued to be preinstalled on all Macintoshes. Microsoft continued to update IE for Mac, which was ported to Mac OS X DP4 in May 2000.

History and development

Conception 

Before the name Safari, a couple of others were drafted including the title 'Freedom'. For over a year, it was privately referred to as  'Alexander', which means strings in coding formats; and 'iBrowse' prior to Safari being conceived.

Safari 1 
On January 7, 2003, at Macworld San Francisco, Apple CEO Steve Jobs announced Safari that was based on WebKit, the company's internal fork of the KHTML browser engine. Apple released the first beta version exclusively on Mac OS X the same day.  Later that date, several official and unofficial beta versions followed until version 1.0 was released on June 23, 2003. On Mac OS X v10.3, Safari was pre-installed as the system's default browser, rather than requiring a manual download, as was the case with the previous Mac OS X versions. Safari's predecessor, the Internet Explorer for Mac, was then included in 10.3 as an alternative.

Safari 2 
In April 2005, Engineer Dave Hyatt fixed several bugs in Safari. His experimental beta passed the Acid2 rendering test on April 27, 2005, marking it the first browser to do so. Safari 2.0 which was released on April 29, 2005, was the sole browser Mac OS X 10.4 offered by default. Apple touted this version as it was capable of running a 1.8x speed boost compared to version 1.2.4 but it did not yet feature the Acid2 bug fixes. These major changes were initially unavailable for end-users unless they privately installed and compiled the WebKit source code or ran one of the nightly automated builds available at OpenDarwin. Version 2.0.2, released on October 31, 2005, finally included the Acid2 bug fixes.

In June 2005 in efforts of KHTML criticisms over the lack of access to change logs, Apple moved the development source code and bug tracking of WebCore and JavaScriptCore to OpenDarwin. They have also open-sourced WebKit. The source code is for non-renderer aspects of the browser such as its GUI elements and the remaining proprietary. The final stable version of Safari 2 and the last version released exclusively with Mac OS X, Safari 2.0.4, was updated on January 10, 2006, for Mac OS X. It was only available within Mac OS X Update 10.4.4, and it delivered fixes to layout and CPU usage issues among other improvements.

Safari 3 
On January 9, 2007, at Macworld San Francisco, Jobs unveiled that Safari 3 was ported to the newly-introduced iPhone within iPhone OS (later called iOS). The mobile version was capable of displaying full, desktop-class websites. At WWDC 2007, Jobs announced Safari 3 for Mac OS X 10.5, Windows XP, and Windows Vista. He ran a benchmark based on the iBench browser test suite comparing the most popular Windows browsers to the browser, and claimed that Safari had the fastest performance. His claim was later examined by a third-party site called Web Performance over HTTP load times. They verified that Safari 3 was indeed the fastest browser on the Windows platform in terms of initial data loading over the Internet, though it was only negligibly faster than Internet Explorer 7 and Mozilla Firefox when it came to static content from the local cache.

The initial Safari 3 beta version for Windows, released on the same day as its announcement at WWDC 2007, contained several bugs and a zero day exploit that allowed remote code executions. The issues were then fixed by Apple three days later on June 14, 2007, in version 3.0.1. On June 22, 2007, Apple released Safari 3.0.2 to address some bugs, performance problems, and other security issues. Safari 3.0.2 for Windows handled some fonts that were missing in the browser but already installed on Windows computers such as Tahoma, Trebuchet MS, and others. The iPhone was previously released on June 29, 2007, with a version of Safari based on the same WebKit rendering engine as the desktop version but with a modified feature set better suited for a mobile device. The version number of Safari as reported in its user agent string is 3.0 was in line along with the contemporary desktop editions.

The first stable, non-beta version of Safari for Windows, Safari 3.1, was offered as a free download on March 18, 2008. In June 2008, Apple released version 3.1.2, which addressed a security vulnerability in the Windows version where visiting a malicious web site could force a download of executable files and execute them on the user's desktop. Safari 3.2, released on November 13, 2008, introduced anti-phishing features using Google Safe Browsing and Extended Validation Certificate support. The final version of Safari 3 was version 3.2.3, which was released on May 12, 2009, with security improvements.

Safari 4 

Safari 4 was released on June 8, 2009. It was the first version that had completely passed the Acid3 rendering test, as well as the first version to support HTML5. It incorporated WebKit JavaScript engine SquirrelFish that significantly enhanced the browser's script interpretation performances by 29.9x. SquirrelFish was later evolved to SquirrelFish Extreme, later also marketed as Nitro, which had 63.6x faster performances. A public beta of Safari 4 was experimented in February 24, 2009.

Safari 4 relied on Cover Flow to run the History and Bookmarks, and it featured Speculative Loading that automatically pre-loaded document information that is required to visit a particular website. The top sites can be displayed up to 24 thumbnails based on the frequently visited sites in a startup. The desktop version of Safari 4 included a redesign similar to that of the iPhone. The update also commissioned many developer tool improvements including Web Inspectors, CSS element viewings, JavaScript debuggers and profilers, offline tables, database management, SQL support and resource graphs. In additions to CSS retouching effects, CSS canvas, and HTML5 content. It replaced the initial Mac OS X-like interface with native Windows themes on Windows using native font renderings.

Safari 4.0.1 was released for Mac on June 17, 2009, and fixed Faces bugs in iPhoto '09. Safari 4 in Mac OS X v10.6 "Snow Leopard" has built-in 64-bit support, which makes JavaScript load up to 50% faster. It also has native crash resistances that would maintain it intact if a plugin like Flash player crashes, though other tabs or windows would not be affected. Safari 4.0.4, the final version which was released on November 11, 2009, for both Mac and Windows, which further improved the JavaScript performances.

Safari 5 

Safari 5 was released on June 7, 2010, and was the final version (version 5.1.7) for Windows. It featured a less distractive reader view, and had a 30x faster JavaScript performances. It incorporated numerous developer tool improvements including HTML5 interoperability, and the accessibility to secure extensions. The progress bar was re-added in this version as well. Safari 5.0.1 enabled the Extensions PrefPane by default, rather than requiring users to manually set it in the Debug menu.

Apple exclusively released Safari 4.1 concurrently with Safari 5 for Mac OS X Tiger. It included many features that were found in Safari 5, though it excluded the Safari Reader and Safari Extensions. Apple released Safari 5.1 for both Windows and Mac on July 20, 2011, for Mac OS X 10.7 Lion; it was faster than Safari 5.0, and included the new Reading List feature. The company simultaneously announced Safari 5.0.6 in late June 2010 for Mac OS X 10.5 Leopard, though the new functions were excluded from Leopard users.

Several HTML5 features were provided in Safari 5. It added supports for full-screen video, closed caption, geolocation, EventSource, and a now obsolete early variant of the WebSocket protocol. The fifth major version of Safari added supports for Full-text search, and a new search engine, Bing. Safari 5 supported Reader, which displays web pages in a continuous view, without advertisements. Safari 5 supported a smarter address field and DNS prefetching that automatically found links and looked up addresses on the web. New web pages loaded faster using Domain Name System (DNS) prefetching. The Windows version received an extra update on Graphic acceleration as well. The blue inline progress bar was returned to the address bar; in addition to the spinning bezel and loading indicator introduced in Safari 4. Top Sites view now had a button to switch to Full History Search. Other features included Extension Builder for developers of Safari Extensions. Other changes included an improved inspector. Safari 5 supports Extensions, add-ons that customize the web browsing experience. Extensions are built using web standards such as HTML5, CSS3, and JavaScript.

Safari 6 

Safari 6.0 was previously referred to as Safari 5.2 until Apple changed the version number at WWDC 2012. The stable release of Safari 6 coincided with the release of OS X Mountain Lion on July 25, 2012, and was integrated within OS. As a result, it was no longer available for download from Apple's website or any other sources. Apple released Safari 6 via Software Update for users of OS X Lion. It was not released for OS X versions before Lion or for Windows. The company later quietly removed references and links for the Windows version of Safari 5. Microsoft had also removed Safari from its browser-choice page.

On June 11, 2012, Apple released a developer preview of Safari 6.0 with a feature called iCloud Tabs, which syncs with open tabs on any iOS or other OS X device that ran the latest software. It updated new privacy features, including an "Ask websites not to track me" preference and the ability for websites to send OS X 10.8 Mountain Lion users notifications, though it removed RSS support. Safari 6 had the Share Sheets capability in OS X Mountain Lion. The Share Sheet options were: Add to Reading List, Add Bookmark, Email this Page, Message, Twitter, and Facebook. Tabs with full-page previews were added, too. The sixth major version of Safari, it added options to allow pages to be shared with other users via email, Messages, Twitter, and Facebook, as well as making some minor performance improvements. Additionally, various features were removed including Activity Window, a separate Download Window, direct support for RSS feeds in the URL field, and bookmarks. The separate search field and the address bar were also no longer available as a toolbar configuration option. Instead, it was replaced by the smart search field, a combination of the address bar and the search field.

Safari 7 

Safari 7 was announced at WWDC 2013,  and it brought a number of JavaScript performance improvements. It made uses of Top Site and Sidebar, Shared Links, and Power Saver which paused unused plugins. Safari 7 for OS X Mavericks and Safari 6.1 for Lion and Mountain Lion were all released along with OS X Mavericks in the special event on October 22, 2013.

Safari 8 
Safari 8 was announced at WWDC 2014 and was released for OS X Yosemite. It included the JavaScript API WebGL, stronger privacy management, improved iCloud integration, and a redesigned interface. It was also faster and more efficient, with additional developer features including JavaScript Promises, CSS Shapes & Composting mark up, IndexedDB, Encrypted Media Extensions, and SPDY protocol.

Safari 9 
Safari 9 was announced in WWDC 2015 and was shipped with OS X El Capitan. New features included audio muting, more options for Safari Reader, and improved autofill. It was not fully available for the previous OS X Yosemite.

Safari 10 

Safari 10 was shipped with macOS Sierra and released for OS X Yosemite and OS X El Capitan on September 20, 2016. It had a redesigned Bookmark and History views, and double-clicking will centralized focus on a  particular folder. The update redirected Safari extensions to be saved directly to Pocket and Dic Go. Software improvements included Autofill quality from the Contrast card and Web Inspector Timelines Tab, in-line sub-headlines, bylines, and publish dates. This version tracks and re-applies zoomed level to websites, and legacy plug-ins were disabled by default in favor of HTML5 versions of websites. Recently closed tabs can be reopened via the History menu, or by holding the "+" button in the tab bar, and using Shift-Command-T. When a link opens in a new tab; it is now possible to hit the back button or swipe to close it and go back to the original tab. Debugging is now supported on the Web Inspector. Safari 10 also includes several security updates, including fixes for six WebKit vulnerabilities and issues related to Reader and Tabs. The first version of Safari 10 was released on September 20, 2016, and the last version (10.1.2) was released on July 19, 2017.

Safari 11 
Safari 11 was released on September 19, 2017 for OS X El Capitan and macOS Sierra. It was shipped with macOS High Sierra. Safari 11 included several new features such as Intelligent Tracking Prevention which aimed to prevent cross-site tracking by placing limitations on cookies and other website data. Intelligent Tracking Prevention allowed first-party cookies to continue track the browser history, though with time limits. For example, first-party cookies from ad-tech companies such as Google/Alphabet Inc., were set to expire in 24-hours after the visit.

Safari 12 

Safari 12 was released for macOS Mojave on September 24, 2018. It was also available to macOS Sierra and macOS High Sierra on September 17, 2018. Safari 12 included several new features such as Icons in tabs, Automatic Strong Passwords, and Intelligent Tracking Prevention 2.0. Safari version 12.0.1 was released on October 30, 2018, within macOS Mojave 10.14.1, and Safari 12.0.2 was released on December 5, 2018, under macOS 10.14.2. Support for developer-signed classic Safari Extensions has been dropped. This version would also be the last that supported the official Extensions Gallery.  Apple also encouraged extension authors to switch to Safari App Extensions, which triggered negative feedback from the community.

Safari 13 
Safari 13 was announced at WWDC 2019 on June 3, 2019. Safari 13 included several new features such as prompting users to change weak passwords, FIDO2 USB security key authentication support, Sign in with Apple support, Apple Pay on the Web support and increased speed and security. Safari 13 was released on September 20, 2019, on macOS Mojave and macOS High Sierra, and later shipped with macOS Catalina.

Safari 14 
In June 2020 it was announced that macOS Big Sur will include Safari 14. According to Apple, Safari 14 is more than 50% faster than Google Chrome. Safari 14 introduced new privacy features, including Privacy Report, which shows blocked content and privacy information on web pages. Users will also receive a monthly report on trackers that Safari has blocked. Extensions can also be enabled or disabled on a site-by-site basis. Safari 14 introduced partial support for the WebExtension API used in Google Chrome, Microsoft Edge, Firefox, and Opera, making it easier for developers to port their extensions from those web browsers to Safari. Support for Adobe Flash Player will also be dropped from Safari, 3 months ahead of its end-of-life. A built-in translation service allows translation of a page to another language. Safari 14 was released as a standalone update to macOS Catalina and Mojave users on September 16, 2020. It added Ecosia as a supported search engine.

Safari 15 
Safari 15 was released for macOS Big Sur and macOS Catalina on September 20, 2021, and later shipped with macOS Monterey. It featured a redesigned interface and tab groups that blended better into the background. There were also a new home page and extension supports on the iOS and iPadOS editions.

Safari 16 
Safari 16 was released for macOS Monterey and macOS Big Sur on September 12, 2022, and later shipped with macOS Ventura. Safari 16 added support for non-animated AVIF and contains several bug fixes and feature polishing.

iOS versions

Safari Technology Preview 
Safari Technology Preview was first released alongside OS X El Capitan 10.11.4. Safari Technology Preview releases include the latest version of WebKit, which included Web technologies in the future stable releases of Safari so that developers and users can install the Technology Preview release on a Mac, test those features, and provide feedback.

Safari Developer Program 
The Safari Developer Program was a program dedicated to in-browser extension and HTML developers.
It allowed members to write and distribute extensions for the browser through the Safari Extensions Gallery. It was initially free until it was incorporated into the Apple Developer Program in WWDC 2015, which costs $99 a year. The charges prompted frustrations from developers. Within OS X El Capitan, Apple implemented the Secure Extension Distribution to further improve its security, and it automatically updated all extensions within the Safari Extensions Gallery.

Features 
Until Safari 6.0, it included a built-in web feed aggregator that supported the RSS and Atom standards. Current features included Private Browsing (a mode in which the browser retains no record of information about the user's web activity), the ability to archive web content in WebArchive format, the ability to email complete web pages directly from a browser menu, the ability to search bookmarks, and the ability to share tabs between all Mac and iOS devices running appropriate versions of software via an iCloud account.

Web compatibility 
Safari pioneered several now standard HTML5 features (such as the Canvas API) in its early years.

More recently, it has been criticized for failing to keep pace with some modern web technologies.

Intelligent Tracking Prevention 
In September 2017 Apple announced that it will use artificial intelligence (AI) to reduce the ability of advertisers to track Safari users as they browse the web. Cookies used for tracking will be allowed for 24 hours, then disabled, unless AI judges the user wants the cookie. Major advertising groups objected, saying it will reduce the free services supported by advertising, while other experts praised the change.

Plugin support
Apple used a remotely updated plug-in blacklist to prevent potentially dangerous or vulnerable plugins from running on Safari. Initially, Flash and Java contents were blocked on some early versions of Safari. Since Safari 12, support for NPAPI plugins (except for Flash) has been completely dropped.  Safari 14 finally dropped support for Adobe Flash Player.

WebExtension support 
Beginning in 2018, Apple made technical changes to Safari's content blocking functionality which prompted backlash from users and developers of ad blocking extensions, who said the changes made it impossible to offer a similar level of user protection found in other browsers. Internally, the update limited the number of blocking rules which could be applied by third-party extensions, preventing the full implementation of community-developed blocklists. In response, several developers of popular ad and tracking blockers announced their products were being discontinued, as they were now incompatible with Safari's newly limited content blocking features.  Beginning with Safari 13, popular extensions such as uBlock Origin no longer work with Safari.

iCloud sync 
Safari can sync bookmarks, history, reading list, and tabs through iCloud. This happens by default if a user's Mac, iPhone or iPad is logged in to iCloud, but syncing can be disabled in the Settings app (on iOS and iPadOS) or System Settings (on Mac).

iCloud Tabs lets users see a list of their other devices' open tabs that have not been added to a tab group. On iOS and iPadOS, these iCloud Tabs are shown below the grid of open tabs. On the Mac, they are shown at the bottom of the Tab Overview, or in an optional iCloud Tabs toolbar item.

Tab Groups 
Safari 15 added tab groups. These tab groups, and the tabs they contain, are synced across devices; when a tab is opened in a tab group on one device, it is added to that tab group on all devices, without needing to manually open it through iCloud Tabs. macOS Ventura added Shared Tab Groups, which can be shared through iMessage. New tabs and closed tabs will sync for all participants, and a small thumbnail with users' profile pictures will be visible on the tab they are currently viewing.

Continuity 
Safari supports the Handoff feature, which allows users to continue where they left off on another device.

Architecture 
On macOS, Safari is a Cocoa application. It used Apple's WebKit for rendering web pages and running JavaScript. WebKit consisted of WebCore (based on Konqueror's KHTML engine) and JavaScriptCore (originally based on KDE's JavaScript engine, named KJS). Like KHTML and KJS, WebCore and JavaScriptCore were free software and were released under the terms of the GNU Lesser General Public License. Some Apple improvements to the KHTML code were merged back into the Konqueror project. Apple had also  released some additional codes under the open source 2-clause BSD-like license. The version of Safari included in Mac OS X v10.6 (and later versions) is compiled for 64-bit architecture. Apple claimed that running Safari in 64-bit mode would increase rendering speeds by up to 50%.

WebKit2 has a multiprocess API for WebKit, where the web-content is handled by a separate process than the application using WebKit. Apple announced WebKit2 in April 2010. Safari for OS X switched to the new API with version 5.1. Safari for iOS switched to WebKit2 with iOS 8.

Platforms

Mac

iOS/iPadOS 
Since 2015, iOS has allowed third party web browsers to be installed, including Chrome, Firefox, Opera and Edge; however, they are all forced to use the underlying WebKit browser engine, and inherit its limitations.

Windows 
Safari for Windows was introduced at WWDC 2007.

After Safari's release, Apple Software Update—an updater program bundled with QuickTime and iTunes for Windows—automatically selected Safari for installation, as a "Recommended" program. When users ran the updater manually, the option to install Safari was checked by default. This was criticized by John Lilly, then-CEO of Mozilla, who said it "borders on malware distribution practices". By late 2008, Apple Software Update stopped installing new software by default, though it still offered Safari in its list of available programs (with its checkbox unticked).

Market share 

In 2009, Safari had a market share of 3.85%. It remained stable in that rank for five years with market shares of 5.56% (2010), 7.41% (2011), 10.07% (2012), and 11.77% (2013). In 2014, it caught up with Firefox with a market share of 14.20%. In 2015, Safari became the second most-used web browser worldwide after Google Chrome, and had a market share of 13.01%. From 2015 to 2020, it occupied market shares of 14.02%, 14.86%, 14.69%, 17.68% and 19.25, respectively. , Google Chrome continued to be the most popular browser with Safari (19.22%) following behind in second place.

In May 2022, according to StatCounter, Apple's Safari dropped to the third most popular desktop browser after being overtaken by Microsoft's Edge. Safari was then used by 9.61 percent of desktop computers worldwide.

Criticism

Security updates for Snow Leopard and Windows 
Software security firm Sophos detailed how Snow Leopard and Windows users were not supported by the Safari 6 release at the time, while there were over 121 vulnerabilities left unpatched on those platforms. Since then, Snow Leopard has had only three minor version releases (the most recent in September 2013), and Windows has had none. While no official word has been released by Apple, the indication is that these are the final versions available for these operating systems, and both retain significant security issues.

See also 
 List of web browsers
 History of web browsers
 United States v. Google Inc. in which the FTC alleged that Google misrepresented privacy assurances to Safari users

References

External links 

 

2003 software
 Apple Inc. software
 Companies' terms of service
Computer-related introductions in 2003
IOS
 IOS web browsers
 IOS-based software made by Apple Inc.
macOS web browsers
 Software based on WebKit
 Web browsers